Janey is an unincorporated community in Buchanan County, Virginia, in the United States.

History
A post office was established as Janey in 1950, and closed in 1958. It was named for Janey Owens, the postmaster's daughter.

References

Unincorporated communities in Buchanan County, Virginia
Unincorporated communities in Virginia